Epiglaea is a genus of moths of the family Noctuidae.

Species
 Epiglaea apiata (Grote, 1874)
 Epiglaea decliva (Grote, 1874)

References

External links
Natural History Museum Lepidoptera genus database
Epiglaea at funet

Cuculliinae